HALO (Hangul: 헤일로; abbreviation for Hexagon of Absolute Light and Organization) was a South Korean boy band formed by Histar Entertainment in Seoul, South Korea. The group consisted of six members: Dino, Inhaeng, Ooon, Jaeyong, Heecheon and Yoondong. They debuted on June 26, 2014, with the single "Fever". The group later disbanded on May 8, 2019.

History

On May 8, 2019, HALO's contract with Histar Entertainment ended. Following the news, Heecheon, Youndoung, and Ooon (under his real name, Jeong Young-hoon) became participants in the reality competition series Produce 101 Japan. However, all members left the show prior to its finale, citing personal reasons.

Members
 Dino (Hangul: 디노)
 Inhaeng (인행)
 Ooon (오운)
 Jaeyong (재용)
 Heecheon (희천)
 Yoondong (윤동)

Discography

Studio albums

Extended plays

Single albums

Singles

Tours 
HALO European Tour 2018 "Here I Am"

References 

K-pop music groups
South Korean boy bands
South Korean dance music groups
Musical groups from Seoul
Musical groups established in 2014
2014 establishments in South Korea
South Korean pop music groups